The Lamiales are an order in the asterid group of dicotyledonous flowering plants. It includes about 23,810 species, 1,059 genera, and is divided into about 24 families. Well-known or economically important members of this order include lavender, lilac, olive, jasmine, the ash tree, teak, snapdragon, sesame, psyllium, garden sage, and a number of table herbs such as mint, basil, and rosemary.

The anthophytes are a grouping of plant taxa bearing flower-like reproductive structures. They were formerly thought to be a clade comprising plants bearing flower-like structures.  The group contained the angiosperms - the extant flowering plants, such as roses and grasses - as well as the Gnetales and the extinct Bennettitales.

23,420 species of vascular plant have been recorded in South Africa, making it the sixth most species-rich country in the world and the most species-rich country on the African continent. Of these, 153 species are considered to be threatened. Nine biomes have been described in South Africa: Fynbos, Succulent Karoo, desert, Nama Karoo, grassland, savanna, Albany thickets, the Indian Ocean coastal belt, and forests.

The 2018 South African National Biodiversity Institute's National Biodiversity Assessment plant checklist lists 35,130 taxa in the phyla Anthocerotophyta (hornworts (6)), Anthophyta (flowering plants (33534)), Bryophyta (mosses (685)), Cycadophyta (cycads (42)), Lycopodiophyta (Lycophytes(45)), Marchantiophyta (liverworts (376)), Pinophyta (conifers (33)), and Pteridophyta (cryptogams (408)).

16 families are represented in the literature. Listed taxa include species, subspecies, varieties, and forms as recorded, some of which have subsequently been allocated to other taxa as synonyms, in which cases the accepted taxon is appended to the listing. Multiple entries under alternative names reflect taxonomic revision over time.

Acanthaceae

Family: Acanthaceae, 66 genera have been recorded. Not all are necessarily currently accepted. 
 
 Genus Acanthodium:
 Genus Acanthopsis:
 Genus Acanthus:
 Genus Adhatoda:
 Genus Angkalanthus:
 Genus Anisotes:
 Genus Asteracantha:
 Genus Asystasia:
 Genus Aulojusticia:
 Genus Avicennia:
 Genus Barleria:
 Genus Blepharacanthus:
 Genus Blepharis:
 Genus Calophanes:
 Genus Chaetacanthus (synonym of Dyschoriste):
 Genus Chorisochora:
 Genus Crabbea:
 Genus Crossandra:
 Genus Dianthera:
 Genus Diapedium:
 Genus Dicliptera:
 Genus Dilivaria:
 Genus Dinteracanthus:
 Genus Dipteracanthus:
 Genus Duosperma:
 Genus Duvernoia:
 Genus Dyschoriste:
 Genus Ecbolium:
 Genus Ecteinanthus:
 Genus Elytraria:
 Genus Eranthemum:
 Genus Gendarussa:
 Genus Glossochilus:
 Genus Hemigraphis:
 Genus Hygrophila:
 Genus Hypoestes:
 Genus Isoglossa:
 Genus Justicia:
 Genus Lepidagathis:
 Genus Leptostachya:
 Genus Mackaya:
 Genus Macrorungia:
 Genus Megalochlamys:
 Genus Metarungia:
 Genus Monechma:
 Genus Neuracanthus:
 Genus Nomaphila:
 Genus Odontonema:
 Genus Peristrophe:
 Genus Petalidium:
 Genus Phaulopsis:
 Genus Pseuderanthemum:
 Genus Pseudobarleria:
 Genus Rhaphidospora:
 Genus Rhinacanthus:
 Genus Rhytiglossa:
 Genus Ruellia:
 Genus Ruelliopsis:
 Genus Rungia:
 Genus Ruspolia:
 Genus Ruttya:
 Genus Salpinctium:
 Genus Sclerochiton:
 Genus Siphonoglossa:
 Genus Thunbergia:

Bignoniaceae
Family: Bignoniaceae,

Rhigozum
Genus Rhigozum:
 Rhigozum brevispinosum Kuntze, indigenous
 Rhigozum obovatum Burch. indigenous
 Rhigozum trichotomum Burch. indigenous
 Rhigozum zambesiacum Baker, indigenous

Spathodea
Genus Spathodea:
 Spathodea campanulata P.Beauv. not indigenous, cultivated, naturalised, invasive

Tanaecium
Genus Tanaecium:
 Tanaecium pinnatum (Jacq.) Willd. accepted as Kigelia africana (Lam.) Benth. subsp. africana

Tecoma
Genus Tecoma:
 Tecoma africana (Lam.) G.Don, accepted as Kigelia africana (Lam.) Benth. 
 Tecoma capensis (Thunb.) Lindl. accepted as Tecomaria capensis (Thunb.) Spach, indigenous
 Tecoma fulva (Cav.) D.Don subsp. garrocha (Hieron.) J.R.I.Wood, not indigenous, cultivated, naturalised
 Tecoma stans (L.) Juss. ex Kunth, not indigenous, naturalised, invasive
 Tecoma stans (L.) Juss. ex Kunth var. stans, not indigenous, cultivated, naturalised, invasive
 Tecoma stans (L.) Juss. ex Kunth var. velutina DC. not indigenous, cultivated, naturalised

Tecomaria
Genus Tecomaria:
 Tecomaria capensis (Thunb.) Spach, indigenous

Gesneriaceae
Family: Gesneriaceae,

Streptocarpus
Genus Streptocarpus:
 Streptocarpus actinoflorus T.J.Edwards & M.Hughes, endemic
 Streptocarpus aylae T.J.Edwards, endemic
 Streptocarpus baudertii L.L.Britten, endemic
 Streptocarpus bolusii C.B.Clarke, accepted as Streptocarpus pusillus Harv. ex C.B.Clarke, endemic
 Streptocarpus breviflos (C.B.Clarke) C.B.Clarke, endemic
 Streptocarpus caeruleus Hilliard & B.L.Burtt, endemic
 Streptocarpus candidus Hilliard, endemic
 Streptocarpus confusus Hilliard, indigenous
 Streptocarpus confusus Hilliard subsp. confusus, indigenous
 Streptocarpus confusus Hilliard subsp. lebomboensis Hilliard & B.L.Burtt, indigenous
 Streptocarpus cooksonii B.L.Burtt, endemic
 Streptocarpus cooperi C.B.Clarke, endemic
 Streptocarpus cyaneus S.Moore, indigenous
 Streptocarpus cyaneus S.Moore subsp. cyaneus, indigenous
 Streptocarpus cyaneus S.Moore subsp. longi-tommii Weigend & T.J.Edwards, endemic
 Streptocarpus cyaneus S.Moore subsp. nigridens Weigend & T.J.Edwards, endemic
 Streptocarpus cyaneus S.Moore subsp. polackii (B.L.Burtt) Weigend & T.J.Edwards, endemic
 Streptocarpus daviesii N.E.Br. ex C.B.Clarke, indigenous
 Streptocarpus decipiens Hilliard & B.L.Burtt, endemic
 Streptocarpus denticulatus Turrill, endemic
 Streptocarpus dunnii Hook.f. indigenous
 Streptocarpus fanniniae Harv. ex C.B.Clarke, endemic
 Streptocarpus fasciatus T.J.Edwards & Kunhardt, endemic
 Streptocarpus fenestra-dei Weigend & T.J.Edwards, endemic
 Streptocarpus floribundus Weigend & T.J.Edwards, endemic
 Streptocarpus formosus (Hilliard & B.L.Burtt) T.J.Edwards, endemic
 Streptocarpus galpinii Hook.f. indigenous
 Streptocarpus gardenii Hook. endemic
 Streptocarpus grandis N.E.Br. indigenous
 Streptocarpus grandis N.E.Br. subsp. grandis, endemic
 Streptocarpus haygarthii N.E.Br. ex C.B.Clarke, endemic
 Streptocarpus hilburtianus T.J.Edwards, endemic
 Streptocarpus johannis L.L.Britten, endemic
 Streptocarpus kentaniensis L.L.Britten & Story, endemic
 Streptocarpus kunhardtii T.J.Edwards, endemic
 Streptocarpus latens Hilliard & B.L.Burtt, endemic
 Streptocarpus lilliputana Bellstedt & T.J.Edwards, endemic
 Streptocarpus longiflorus (Hilliard & B.L.Burtt) T.J.Edwards, endemic
 Streptocarpus makabengensis Hilliard, endemic
 Streptocarpus meyeri B.L.Burtt, endemic
 Streptocarpus micranthus C.B.Clarke, indigenous
 Streptocarpus modestus L.L.Britten, endemic
 Streptocarpus molweniensis Hilliard, indigenous
 Streptocarpus molweniensis Hilliard subsp. eshowicus Hilliard & B.L.Burtt, endemic
 Streptocarpus molweniensis Hilliard subsp. molweniensis, endemic
 Streptocarpus montigena L.L.Britten, endemic
 Streptocarpus occultis Hilliard, endemic
 Streptocarpus parviflorus Hook.f. indigenous
 Streptocarpus parviflorus Hook.f. subsp. parviflorus, endemic
 Streptocarpus parviflorus Hook.f. subsp. soutpansbergensis Weigend & T.J.Edwards, endemic
 Streptocarpus pentherianus Fritsch, indigenous
 Streptocarpus pogonites Hilliard & B.L.Burtt, endemic
 Streptocarpus pole-evansii I.Verd. endemic
 Streptocarpus polyanthus Hook. indigenous
 Streptocarpus polyanthus Hook. subsp. comptonii (Mansf.) Hilliard, indigenous
 Streptocarpus polyanthus Hook. subsp. dracomontanus Hilliard, endemic
 Streptocarpus polyanthus Hook. subsp. polyanthus, endemic
 Streptocarpus polyanthus Hook. subsp. verecundus Hilliard, endemic
 Streptocarpus porphyrostachys Hilliard, endemic
 Streptocarpus primulifolius Gand. endemic
 Streptocarpus primulifolius Gand. subsp. formosus Hilliard & B.L.Burtt, accepted as Streptocarpus formosus (Hilliard & B.L.Burtt) T.J.Edwards, endemic
 Streptocarpus prolixus C.B.Clarke, endemic
 Streptocarpus pusillus Harv. ex C.B.Clarke, indigenous
 Streptocarpus rexii (Bowie ex Hook.) Lindl. endemic
 Streptocarpus rimicola Story, endemic
 Streptocarpus roseo-albus Weigend & T.J.Edwards, endemic
 Streptocarpus saundersii Hook. endemic
 Streptocarpus silvaticus Hilliard, endemic
 Streptocarpus trabeculatus Hilliard, endemic
 Streptocarpus vandeleurii Baker f. & S.Moore, endemic
 Streptocarpus wendlandii Spreng. endemic
 Streptocarpus wilmsii Engl. indigenous

Lamiaceae
 
Family: Lamiaceae, 49 genera have been recorded. Not all are necessarily currently accepted. 

 Genus Acrocephalus:
 Genus Acrotome:
 Genus Aeollanthus:
 Genus Ajuga:
 Genus Ballota:
 Genus Basilicum:
 Genus Becium:
 Genus Cantinoa:
 Genus Cedronella:
 Genus Clerodendrum:
 Genus Cyclonema:
 Genus Endostemon:
 Genus Geniosporum:
 Genus Hemizygia:
 Genus Hoslundia:
 Genus Isodon:
 Genus Kalaharia:
 Genus Karomia:
 Genus Killickia:
 Genus Lamium:
 Genus Lasiocorys:
 Genus Leonotis:
 Genus Leucas:
 Genus Marrubium:
 Genus Mentha:
 Genus Mesosphaerum:
 Genus Ocimum:
 Genus Orthosiphon:
 Genus Platostoma:
 Genus Plectranthus:
 Genus Premna:
 Genus Prunella:
 Genus Pycnostachys:
 Genus Rabdosiella:
 Genus Rotheca:
 Genus Salvia:
 Genus Satureja:
 Genus Scutellaria:
 Genus Siphonanthus:
 Genus Solenostemon:
 Genus Spironema:
 Genus Stachys:
 Genus Syncolostemon:
 Genus Tetradenia:
 Genus Teucrium:
 Genus Thorncroftia:
 Genus Tinnea:
 Genus Vitex:
 Genus Volkameria:

Lentibulariaceae
Family: Lentibulariaceae,

Genlisea
Genus Genlisea:
 Genlisea hispidula Stapf, indigenous

Utricularia
Genus Utricularia:
 Utricularia arenaria A.DC. indigenous
 Utricularia australis R.Br. indigenous
 Utricularia benjaminiana Oliv. indigenous
 Utricularia bisquamata Schrank, indigenous
 Utricularia brachyceras Schltr. accepted as Utricularia bisquamata Schrank, indigenous
 Utricularia cymbantha Oliv. indigenous
 Utricularia firmula Welw. ex Oliv. indigenous
 Utricularia foliosa L. indigenous
 Utricularia gibba L. indigenous
 Utricularia inflexa Forssk. indigenous
 Utricularia livida E.Mey. indigenous
 Utricularia prehensilis E.Mey. indigenous
 Utricularia reflexa Oliv. indigenous
 Utricularia sandersonii Oliv. endemic
 Utricularia scandens Benj. indigenous
 Utricularia stellaris L.f., indigenous
 Utricularia subulata L. indigenous
 Utricularia welwitschii Oliv. indigenous

Linderniaceae
Family: Linderniaceae,

Bonnaya
Genus Bonnaya:
 Bonnaya parviflora (Roxb.) Benth. accepted as Lindernia parviflora (Roxb.) Haines, indigenous

Craterostigma
Genus Craterostigma:
 Craterostigma monroi S.Moore, accepted as Lindernia monroi (S.Moore) Eb.Fisch. indigenous
 Craterostigma nanum (Benth.) Engl. accepted as Craterostigma plantagineum Hochst. present
 Craterostigma plantagineum Hochst. indigenous
 Craterostigma wilmsii Engl. ex Diels, endemic

Crepidorhopalon
Genus Crepidorhopalon:
 Crepidorhopalon debilis (Skan) Eb.Fisch. indigenous
 Crepidorhopalon spicatus (Engl.) Eb.Fisch. indigenous

Ilysanthes
Genus Ilysanthes:
 Ilysanthes bolusii Hiern, accepted as Linderniella bolusii (Hiern) Eb.Fisch. Schaferh. & Kai Mull. indigenous
 Ilysanthes capensis (Thunb.) Benth. accepted as Lindernia capensis Thunb. indigenous
 Ilysanthes conferta Hiern, accepted as Lindernia conferta (Hiern) Philcox, indigenous
 Ilysanthes muddii Hiern, accepted as Linderniella wilmsii (Engl. ex Diels) Eb.Fisch. Schaferh. & Kai Mull. indigenous
 Ilysanthes nana Engl. accepted as Linderniella nana (Engl.) Eb.Fisch. Schaferh. & Kai Mull. indigenous
 Ilysanthes parviflora (Roxb.) Benth. accepted as Lindernia parviflora (Roxb.) Haines, indigenous
 Ilysanthes pulchella Skan, accepted as Linderniella pulchella (Skan) Eb.Fisch. Schaferh. & Kai Mull. indigenous
 Ilysanthes schlechteri Hiern, accepted as Linderniella nana (Engl.) Eb.Fisch. Schaferh. & Kai Mull. indigenous
 Ilysanthes wilmsii Engl. ex Diels, accepted as Linderniella wilmsii (Engl. ex Diels) Eb.Fisch. Schaferh. & Kai Mull. indigenous

Lindernia
Genus Lindernia:
 Lindernia bolusii (Hiern) Eb.Fisch. accepted as Linderniella bolusii (Hiern) Eb.Fisch. Schaferh. & Kai Mull. indigenous
 Lindernia capensis Thunb. endemic
 Lindernia conferta (Hiern) Philcox, indigenous
 Lindernia debilis Skan, accepted as Crepidorhopalon debilis (Skan) Eb.Fisch. indigenous
 Lindernia dongolensis E.A.Bruce, accepted as Lindernia monroi (S.Moore) Eb.Fisch. indigenous
 Lindernia fugax R.G.N.Young, accepted as Crepidorhopalon debilis (Skan) Eb.Fisch. indigenous
 Lindernia minima R.G.N.Young, accepted as Crepidorhopalon debilis (Skan) Eb.Fisch. indigenous
 Lindernia monroi (S.Moore) Eb.Fisch. indigenous
 Lindernia nana (Engl.) Roessler, accepted as Linderniella nana (Engl.) Eb.Fisch. Schaferh. & Kai Mull. indigenous
 Lindernia parviflora (Roxb.) Haines, indigenous
 Lindernia pulchella (Skan) Philcox, accepted as Linderniella pulchella (Skan) Eb.Fisch. Schaferh. & Kai Mull. indigenous
 Lindernia wilmsii (Engl. ex Diels) Philcox, accepted as Linderniella wilmsii (Engl. ex Diels) Eb.Fisch. Schaferh. & Kai Mull. indigenous

Linderniella
Genus Linderniella:
 Linderniella bolusii (Hiern) Eb.Fisch. Schaferh. & Kai Mull. indigenous
 Linderniella nana (Engl.) Eb.Fisch. Schaferh. & Kai Mull. indigenous
 Linderniella pulchella (Skan) Eb.Fisch. Schaferh. & Kai Mull. indigenous
 Linderniella wilmsii (Engl. ex Diels) Eb.Fisch. Schaferh. & Kai Mull. indigenous

Nortenia
Genus Nortenia:
 Nortenia thouarsii Cham. & Schltdl. accepted as Torenia thouarsii (Cham. & Schltdl.) Kuntze, indigenous

Stemodiopsis
Genus Stemodiopsis:
 Stemodiopsis humilis Skan, accepted as Stemodiopsis rivae Engl. present
 Stemodiopsis rivae Engl. indigenous

Torenia
Genus Torenia:
 Torenia monroi (S.Moore) Philcox, accepted as Lindernia monroi (S.Moore) Eb.Fisch. indigenous
 Torenia plantaginea (Hochst.) Benth. accepted as Craterostigma plantagineum Hochst. indigenous
 Torenia spicata Engl. accepted as Crepidorhopalon spicatus (Engl.) Eb.Fisch. indigenous
 Torenia thouarsii (Cham. & Schltdl.) Kuntze, indigenous

Martyniaceae
Family: Martyniaceae,

Ibicella
Genus Ibicella:
 Ibicella lutea (Lindl.) Van Eselt. not indigenous, naturalised

Proboscidea
Genus Proboscidea:
 Proboscidea fragrans (Lindl.) Decne. accepted as Proboscidea louisianica (Mill.) Thell. subsp. fragrans (Lindl.) Bretting, not indigenous, naturalised
 Proboscidea louisianica (Mill.) Thell. not indigenous, naturalised
 Proboscidea louisianica (Mill.) Thell. subsp. fragrans (Lindl.) Bretting, not indigenous, naturalised

Oleaceae
Family: Oleaceae,

Chionanthus
Genus Chionanthus:
 Chionanthus battiscombei (Hutch.) Stearn, indigenous
 Chionanthus foveolatus (E.Mey.) Stearn, indigenous
 Chionanthus foveolatus (E.Mey.) Stearn subsp. foveolatus, indigenous
 Chionanthus foveolatus (E.Mey.) Stearn subsp. major (I.Verd.) Stearn, indigenous
 Chionanthus foveolatus (E.Mey.) Stearn subsp. tomentellus (I.Verd.) Stearn, endemic
 Chionanthus peglerae (C.H.Wright) Stearn, endemic

Enaimon
Genus Enaimon:
 Enaimon undulatum (Aiton) Raf. accepted as Olea capensis L. subsp. capensis

Faulia
Genus Faulia:
 Faulia verrucosa Raf. accepted as Olea capensis L. subsp. capensis

Fraxinus
Genus Fraxinus:
 Fraxinus americana L. not indigenous, naturalised, invasive
 Fraxinus angustifolia Vahl, not indigenous, naturalised, invasive

Jasminum
Genus Jasminum:
 Jasminum abyssinicum Hochst. ex DC. indigenous
 Jasminum angulare Vahl, indigenous
 Jasminum breviflorum Harv. ex C.H.Wright, indigenous
 Jasminum fluminense Vell. indigenous
 Jasminum fluminense Vell. subsp. fluminense, indigenous
 Jasminum glaucum (L.f.) Aiton, endemic
 Jasminum multipartitum Hochst. indigenous
 Jasminum quinatum Schinz, endemic
 Jasminum stenolobum Rolfe, indigenous
 Jasminum streptopus E.Mey. indigenous
 Jasminum streptopus E.Mey. var. streptopus, indigenous
 Jasminum streptopus E.Mey. var. transvaalensis (S.Moore) I.Verd. indigenous
 Jasminum tortuosum Willd. endemic

Leuranthus
Genus Leuranthus:
 Leuranthus woodianus (Knobl.) Knobl. accepted as Olea woodiana Knobl. subsp. woodiana 
 Ligustrum hookeri Decne. accepted as Olea capensis L. subsp. capensis 
 Ligustrum japonicum Thunb. not indigenous, cultivated, naturalised, invasive
 Ligustrum lucidum W.T.Aiton, not indigenous, cultivated, naturalised, invasive
 Ligustrum nepalense Wall. var. glabrum Hook. accepted as Olea capensis L. subsp. capensis 
 Ligustrum ovalifolium Hassk. not indigenous, cultivated, naturalised, invasive
 Ligustrum sinense Lour. not indigenous, cultivated, naturalised, invasive
 Ligustrum vulgare L. not indigenous, cultivated, naturalised, invasive

Linociera
Genus Linociera:
 Linociera lebrunii Staner, accepted as Olea europaea L. subsp. cuspidata (Wall. ex G.Don) Cif. 
 Linociera urophylla Gilg, accepted as Olea capensis L. subsp. capensis

Menodora
Genus Menodora:
 Menodora africana Hook. indigenous
 Menodora heterophylla Moric. ex DC. indigenous
 Menodora heterophylla Moric. ex DC. var. australis Steyerm. indigenous
 Menodora juncea Harv. endemic

Olea
Genus Olea:
 Olea africana Mill. accepted as Olea europaea L. subsp. cuspidata (Wall. ex G.Don) Cif. 
 Olea asiatica Desf. accepted as Olea europaea L. subsp. cuspidata (Wall. ex G.Don) Cif. 
 Olea aucheri A.Chev. ex Ehrend. accepted as Olea europaea L. subsp. cuspidata (Wall. ex G.Don) Cif. 
 Olea buxifolia Mill. accepted as Olea capensis L. subsp. capensis 
 Olea capensis L. indigenous
 Olea capensis L. subsp. capensis, endemic
 Olea capensis L. subsp. enervis (Harv. ex C.H.Wright) I.Verd. indigenous
 Olea capensis L. subsp. hochstetteri (Baker) Friis & P.S.Green, accepted as Olea capensis L. subsp. macrocarpa (C.H.Wright) I.Verd. 
 Olea capensis L. subsp. macrocarpa (C.H.Wright) I.Verd. indigenous
 Olea capensis L. var. coriacea Aiton, accepted as Olea capensis L. subsp. capensis 
 Olea capensis L. var. undulata Aiton, accepted as Olea capensis L. subsp. capensis 
 Olea cassinifolia Salisb. accepted as Olea capensis L. subsp. capensis 
 Olea chrysophylla Lam. var. albida A.Chev. accepted as Olea europaea L. subsp. cuspidata (Wall. ex G.Don) Cif. 
 Olea chrysophylla Lam. var. aucheri A.Chev. accepted as Olea europaea L. subsp. cuspidata (Wall. ex G.Don) Cif. 
 Olea chrysophylla Lam. var. brachybotrys DC. accepted as Olea europaea L. subsp. cuspidata (Wall. ex G.Don) Cif. indigenous
 Olea chrysophylla Lam. var. cuspidata (Wall. ex G.Don) A.Chev. accepted as Olea europaea L. subsp. cuspidata (Wall. ex G.Don) Cif. 
 Olea chrysophylla Lam. var. euchrysophylla A.Chev. accepted as Olea europaea L. subsp. cuspidata (Wall. ex G.Don) Cif. 
 Olea chrysophylla Lam. var. ferruginea (Royle) A.Chev. accepted as Olea europaea L. subsp. cuspidata (Wall. ex G.Don) Cif. 
 Olea chrysophylla Lam. var. nubica (Schweinf. ex Baker) A.Chev. accepted as Olea europaea L. subsp. cuspidata (Wall. ex G.Don) Cif. 
 Olea chrysophylla Lam. var. somaliensis (Baker) A.Chev. accepted as Olea europaea L. subsp. cuspidata (Wall. ex G.Don) Cif. 
 Olea chrysophylla Lam. var. subnuda R.E.Fr. accepted as Olea europaea L. subsp. cuspidata (Wall. ex G.Don) Cif. 
 Olea chrysophylla Lam. var. verrucosa (Willd.) A.Chev. accepted as Olea europaea L. subsp. cuspidata (Wall. ex G.Don) Cif. 
 Olea concolor E.Mey. accepted as Olea capensis L. subsp. capensis, indigenous
 Olea cuspidata Wall. ex G.Don, accepted as Olea europaea L. subsp. cuspidata (Wall. ex G.Don) Cif. 
 Olea europaea L. indigenous
 Olea europaea L. subsp. africana (Mill.) P.S.Green, accepted as Olea europaea L. subsp. cuspidata (Wall. ex G.Don) Cif. indigenous
 Olea europaea L. subsp. cuspidata (Wall. ex G.Don) Cif. indigenous
 Olea europaea L. subsp. ferruginea (Royle) Cif. accepted as Olea europaea L. subsp. cuspidata (Wall. ex G.Don) Cif. 
 Olea europaea L. var. cuspidata (Wall. ex G.Don) Cif. accepted as Olea europaea L. subsp. cuspidata (Wall. ex G.Don) Cif. 
 Olea europaea L. var. nubica Schweinf. ex Baker, accepted as Olea europaea L. subsp. cuspidata (Wall. ex G.Don) Cif. 
 Olea europaea L. var. verrucosa Willd. accepted as Olea europaea L. subsp. cuspidata (Wall. ex G.Don) Cif. indigenous
 Olea exasperata Jacq. endemic
 Olea ferruginea Royle, accepted as Olea europaea L. subsp. cuspidata (Wall. ex G.Don) Cif. 
 Olea glabella Banks ex Lowe, accepted as Olea exasperata Jacq. 
 Olea guineensis Hutch. & C.A.Sm. accepted as Olea capensis L. subsp. macrocarpa (C.H.Wright) I.Verd. 
 Olea hochstetteri Baker, accepted as Olea capensis L. subsp. macrocarpa (C.H.Wright) I.Verd. 
 Olea humilis Eckl. accepted as Olea exasperata Jacq. indigenous
 Olea indica Burm.f. accepted as Olea europaea L. subsp. cuspidata (Wall. ex G.Don) Cif. 
 Olea intermedia Tausch, accepted as Olea capensis L. subsp. capensis 
 Olea kilimandscharica Knobl. accepted as Olea europaea L. subsp. cuspidata (Wall. ex G.Don) Cif. 
 Olea laurifolia Lam. accepted as Olea capensis L. subsp. capensis 
 Olea laurifolia Lam. var. concolor (E.Mey.) Harv. accepted as Olea capensis L. subsp. capensis 
 Olea listeriana Sim, accepted as Olea woodiana Knobl. subsp. woodiana 
 Olea mackenii Harv. accepted as Olea woodiana Knobl. subsp. woodiana 
 Olea macrocarpa C.H.Wright, accepted as Olea capensis L. subsp. macrocarpa (C.H.Wright) I.Verd. indigenous
 Olea madagascariensis Boivin ex H.Perrier, accepted as Olea capensis L. subsp. macrocarpa (C.H.Wright) I.Verd. 
 Olea monticola Gand. accepted as Olea europaea L. subsp. cuspidata (Wall. ex G.Don) Cif. 
 Olea nigra Loisel. accepted as Olea capensis L. subsp. capensis 
 Olea perrieri A.Chev. ex H.Perrier, accepted as Olea capensis L. subsp. macrocarpa (C.H.Wright) I.Verd. 
 Olea sativa Hoffmanns. & Link var. verrucosa (Willd.) Roem. & Schult. accepted as Olea europaea L. subsp. cuspidata (Wall. ex G.Don) Cif. 
 Olea schimperi Gand. accepted as Olea europaea L. subsp. cuspidata (Wall. ex G.Don) Cif. 
 Olea similis Burch. accepted as Olea europaea L. subsp. cuspidata (Wall. ex G.Don) Cif. indigenous
 Olea somaliensis Baker, accepted as Olea europaea L. subsp. cuspidata (Wall. ex G.Don) Cif. 
 Olea subtrinervata Chiov. accepted as Olea europaea L. subsp. cuspidata (Wall. ex G.Don) Cif. 
 Olea undulata (Aiton) Jacq. accepted as Olea capensis L. subsp. capensis 
 Olea undulata (Aiton) Jacq. var. planifolia E.Mey. accepted as Olea capensis L. subsp. capensis 
 Olea urophylla (Gilg) Gilg & Schellenb. accepted as Olea capensis L. subsp. capensis 
 Olea verrucosa (Willd.) Link, accepted as Olea europaea L. subsp. cuspidata (Wall. ex G.Don) Cif. 
 Olea woodiana Knobl. indigenous
 Olea woodiana Knobl. subsp. woodiana, indigenous

Schrebera
Genus Schrebera:
 Schrebera alata (Hochst.) Welw. indigenous

Steganthus
Genus Steganthus:
 Steganthus urophylla (Gilg) Knobl. accepted as Olea capensis L. subsp. capensis

Orobanchaceae
Family: Orobanchaceae,

Alectra
Genus Alectra:
 Alectra avensis (Benth.) Merr. accepted as Alectra sessiliflora (Vahl) Kuntze, present
 Alectra basutica (E.Phillips) Melch. indigenous
 Alectra capensis Thunb. indigenous
 Alectra dunensis Hilliard & B.L.Burtt, indigenous
 Alectra indica Benth. accepted as Alectra sessiliflora (Vahl) Kuntze, present
 Alectra kirkii Hemsl. accepted as Alectra orobanchoides Benth. present
 Alectra lurida Harv. endemic
 Alectra natalensis (Hiern) Melch. endemic
 Alectra orobanchoides Benth. indigenous
 Alectra parvifolia (Engl.) Schinz, accepted as Alectra orobanchoides Benth. present
 Alectra picta (Hiern) Hemsl. indigenous
 Alectra pumila Benth. indigenous
 Alectra sessiliflora (Vahl) Kuntze, indigenous
 Alectra sessiliflora (Vahl) Kuntze var. monticola (Engl.) Melch. accepted as Alectra sessiliflora (Vahl) Kuntze, present
 Alectra thyrsoidea Melch. endemic
 Alectra vogelii Benth. indigenous
 Alectra welwitschii (Hiern) Hemsl. indigenous

Bartsia
Genus Bartsia:
 Bartsia trixago L. not indigenous, naturalised

Buchnera
Genus Buchnera:
 Buchnera brevibractealis Hiern, accepted as Buchnera longespicata Schinz, present
 Buchnera capitata Burm.f., indigenous
 Buchnera ciliolata Engl. indigenous
 Buchnera dura Benth. indigenous
 Buchnera erinoides Jaroscz, indigenous
 Buchnera glabrata Benth. accepted as Buchnera simplex (Thunb.) Druce, present
 Buchnera longespicata Schinz, indigenous
 Buchnera oppositifolia Hort. ex Steud. accepted as Chaenostoma hispidum (Thunb.) Benth. 
 Buchnera reducta Hiern, indigenous
 Buchnera remotiflora Schinz, endemic
 Buchnera simplex (Thunb.) Druce, indigenous
 Buchnera viscosa Aiton, accepted as Chaenostoma caeruleum (L.f.) Kornhall

Buttonia
Genus Buttonia:
 Buttonia natalensis McKen ex Benth. indigenous
 Buttonia superba Oberm. indigenous

Cycnium
Genus Cycnium:
 Cycnium adonense E.Mey. ex Benth. indigenous
 Cycnium adonense E.Mey. ex Benth. subsp. adonense, indigenous
 Cycnium huttoniae Hiern, accepted as Cycnium racemosum Benth. present
 Cycnium racemosum Benth. indigenous
 Cycnium tubulosum (L.f.) Engl. indigenous
 Cycnium tubulosum (L.f.) Engl. subsp. tubulosum, indigenous

Gerardia
Genus Gerardia:
 Gerardia sessiliflora Vahl, accepted as Alectra sessiliflora (Vahl) Kuntze, present

Gerardiina
Genus Gerardiina:
 Gerardiina angolensis Engl. indigenous

Glossostylis
Genus Glossostylis:
 Glossostylis avensis Benth. accepted as Alectra sessiliflora (Vahl) Kuntze, present

Graderia
Genus Graderia:
 Graderia linearifolia Codd, endemic
 Graderia scabra (L.f.) Benth. indigenous
 Graderia subintegra Mast. indigenous

Haematobanche
Genus Haematobanche:
 Haematobanche sanguinea C.Presl, accepted as Hyobanche rubra N.E.Br. indigenous

Harveya
Genus Harveya:
 Harveya anisodonta C.A.Sm. accepted as Harveya speciosa Bernh. endemic
 Harveya bodkinii Hiern, endemic
 Harveya bolusii Kuntze, endemic
 Harveya capensis Hook. endemic
 Harveya cathcartensis Kuntze, accepted as Harveya speciosa Bernh. endemic
 Harveya coccinea (Harv.) Schltr. accepted as Harveya pauciflora (Benth.) Hiern, indigenous
 Harveya euryantha Schltr. accepted as Harveya purpurea (L.f.) Harv. ex Hook. subsp. euryantha (Schltr.) Randle, endemic
 Harveya hirtiflora Schltr. accepted as Harveya bolusii Kuntze, endemic
 Harveya huttonii Hiern, endemic
 Harveya hyobanchoides Schltr. ex Hiern, endemic
 Harveya laxiflora Hiern, accepted as Harveya purpurea (L.f.) Harv. ex Hook. subsp. purpurea, endemic
 Harveya leucopharynx Hilliard & B.L.Burtt, accepted as Harveya huttonii Hiern, endemic
 Harveya pauciflora (Benth.) Hiern, indigenous
 Harveya pulchra Hilliard & B.L.Burtt, accepted as Harveya huttonii Hiern, indigenous
 Harveya pumila Schltr. indigenous
 Harveya purpurea (L.f.) Harv. ex Hook., endemic
 Harveya purpurea (L.f.) Harv. ex Hook. subsp. euryantha (Schltr.) Randle, endemic
 Harveya purpurea (L.f.) Harv. ex Hook. subsp. purpurea, indigenous
 Harveya purpurea (L.f.) Harv. ex Hook. subsp. sulphurea (Hiern) Randle, endemic
 Harveya randii Hiern, accepted as Harveya pumila Schltr. indigenous
 Harveya roseoalba J.C.Manning & Goldblatt, endemic
 Harveya scarlatina (Benth.) Hiern, indigenous
 Harveya silvatica Hilliard & B.L.Burtt, accepted as Harveya huttonii Hiern, indigenous
 Harveya speciosa Bernh. indigenous
 Harveya squamosa (Thunb.) Steud. endemic
 Harveya stenosiphon Hiern, endemic
 Harveya sulphurea Hiern, accepted as Harveya purpurea (L.f.) Harv. ex Hook. subsp. sulphurea (Hiern) Randle, endemic
 Harveya tubulosa Harv. ex Hiern, accepted as Harveya pauciflora (Benth.) Hiern, endemic
 Harveya tulbaghiensis Eckl. & Zeyh. ex Ostermeyer, accepted as Harveya tulbaghensis (Eckl. & Zeyh. ex C.Presl) C.Presl 
 Harveya vestita Hiern, endemic

Hyobanche
Genus Hyobanche:
 Hyobanche atropurpurea Bolus, endemic
 Hyobanche barklyi N.E.Br. indigenous
 Hyobanche calvescens Gand. accepted as Hyobanche rubra N.E.Br. endemic
 Hyobanche coccinea L. ex Steud. accepted as Hyobanche sanguinea L. indigenous
 Hyobanche fulleri E.Phillips, endemic
 Hyobanche glabrata Hiern, accepted as Hyobanche rubra N.E.Br. endemic
 Hyobanche robusta Schonland, endemic
 Hyobanche rubra N.E.Br. indigenous
 Hyobanche sanguinea L. indigenous
 Hyobanche thinophila A.D.Wolfe, endemic

Melasma
Genus Melasma:
 Melasma scabrum P.J.Bergius, indigenous
 Melasma scabrum P.J.Bergius var. ovatum (E.Mey. ex Benth.) Hiern, endemic
 Melasma scabrum P.J.Bergius var. scabrum, indigenous

Orobanche
Genus Orobanche:
 Orobanche minor Sm. not indigenous, naturalised, invasive
 Orobanche ramosa L. not indigenous, naturalised, invasive

Rhamphicarpa
Genus Rhamphicarpa:
 Rhamphicarpa brevipedicellata O.J.Hansen, indigenous
 Rhamphicarpa fistulosa (Hochst.) Benth. indigenous

Sopubia
Genus Sopubia:
 Sopubia cana Harv. indigenous
 Sopubia cana Harv. var. cana, indigenous
 Sopubia cana Harv. var. glabrescens Diels, indigenous
 Sopubia karaguensis Oliv. indigenous
 Sopubia karaguensis Oliv. var. karaguensis, indigenous
 Sopubia mannii Skan, indigenous
 Sopubia mannii Skan var. tenuifolia (Engl. & Gilg) Hepper, indigenous
 Sopubia simplex (Hochst.) Hochst. indigenous

Striga
Genus Striga:
 Striga asiatica (L.) Kuntze, indigenous
 Striga bilabiata (Thunb.) Kuntze, indigenous
 Striga bilabiata (Thunb.) Kuntze subsp. bilabiata, indigenous
 Striga elegans Benth. indigenous
 Striga forbesii Benth. indigenous
 Striga gesnerioides (Willd.) Vatke, indigenous
 Striga junodii Schinz, indigenous

Paulowniaceae
Family: Paulowniaceae,
 Paulownia tomentosa (Thunb.) Steud. not indigenous, naturalised, invasive

Pedaliaceae
Family: Pedaliaceae,

Ceratotheca
Genus Ceratotheca:
 Ceratotheca saxicola E.A.Bruce, endemic
 Ceratotheca triloba (Bernh.) Hook.f. indigenous

Dicerocaryum
Genus Dicerocaryum:
 Dicerocaryum eriocarpum (Decne.) Abels, indigenous
 Dicerocaryum forbesii (Decne.) A.E.van Wyk, indigenous
 Dicerocaryum senecioides (Klotzsch) Abels, indigenous
 Dicerocaryum senecioides (Klotzsch) Abels subsp. transvaalense Abels, accepted as Dicerocaryum senecioides (Klotzsch) Abels, present

Harpagophytum
Genus Harpagophytum:
 Harpagophytum procumbens (Burch.) DC. ex Meisn. subsp. procumbens, indigenous
 Harpagophytum procumbens (Burch.) DC. ex Meisn. subsp. transvaalense Ihlenf. & H.E.K.Hartmann, indigenous
 Harpagophytum procumbens Burch. ex Meisn. indigenous
 Harpagophytum zeyheri Decne. indigenous
 Harpagophytum zeyheri Decne. subsp. schijffii Ihlenf. & H.E.K.Hartmann, indigenous
 Harpagophytum zeyheri Decne. subsp. zeyheri, indigenous

Holubia
Genus Holubia:
 Holubia saccata Oliv. indigenous

Pterodiscus
Genus Pterodiscus:
 Pterodiscus cinnabarinus Peckover, indigenous
 Pterodiscus luridus Hook.f. endemic
 Pterodiscus makatiniensis Peckover, endemic
 Pterodiscus ngamicus N.E.Br. ex Stapf, indigenous
 Pterodiscus speciosus Hook. indigenous

Rogeria
Genus Rogeria:
 Rogeria longiflora (L.) J.Gay ex DC. indigenous
 Rogeria petrophila De Winter, accepted as Dewinteria petrophila (De Winter) Van Jaarsv. & A.E.van Wyk

Sesamothamnus
Genus Sesamothamnus:
 Sesamothamnus lugardii N.E.Br. ex Stapf, indigenous

Sesamum
Genus Sesamum:
 Sesamum alatum Thonn. indigenous
 Sesamum capense Burm.f. indigenous
 Sesamum indicum L. not indigenous, naturalised
 Sesamum schenckii Asch. accepted as Sesamum triphyllum Welw. ex Asch. var. grandiflorum (Schinz) Merxm. present
 Sesamum triphyllum Welw. ex Asch. indigenous
 Sesamum triphyllum Welw. ex Asch. var. triphyllum, indigenous

Phrymaciae
Family Phrymaceae:

Genus Mimulus:
 Mimulus gracilis R.Br. indigenous
 Mimulus moschatus Douglas, not indigenous, naturalised
 Mimulus moschatus Douglas var. moschatus, not indigenous, naturalised

Plantaginaceae
Family: Plantaginaceae,

Antirrhinum
Genus Antirrhinum:
 Antirrhinum orontium L. accepted as Misopates orontium (L.) Raf. subsp. orontium, not indigenous, naturalised
 Antirrhinum unilabiata L.f. accepted as Alonsoa unilabiata (L.f.) Steud. present

Bacopa
Genus Bacopa:
 Bacopa crenata (P.Beauv.) Hepper, indigenous
 Bacopa floribunda (R.Br.) Wettst. indigenous
 Bacopa monnieri (L.) Pennell, indigenous

Callitriche
Genus Callitriche:
 Callitriche bolusii Schonland & Pax ex Marloth, indigenous
 Callitriche compressa N.E.Br. endemic
 Callitriche deflexa A.Br. ex Hegelm. not indigenous, naturalised

Cymbalaria
Genus Cymbalaria:
 Cymbalaria muralis G.Gaertn. B.Mey. & Scherb. not indigenous, naturalised, invasive
 Cymbalaria muralis G.Gaertn. B.Mey. & Scherb. subsp. muralis, not indigenous, naturalised, invasive

Dopatrium
Genus Dopatrium:
 Dopatrium junceum (Roxb.) Buch.-Ham. ex Benth. indigenous

Erinus
Genus Erinus:
 Erinus viscosus (Aiton) Salisb. accepted as Chaenostoma caeruleum (L.f.) Kornhall

Kickxia
Genus Kickxia:
 Kickxia elatine (L.) Dumort. subsp. elatine, not indigenous, naturalised
 Kickxia spuria (L.) Dumort. not indigenous, naturalised
 Kickxia spuria (L.) Dumort. subsp. spuria, not indigenous, naturalised

Limnophila
Genus Limnophila:
 Limnophila indica (L.) Druce, indigenous

Linaria
Genus Linaria:
 Linaria dalmatica (L.) Mill. not indigenous, naturalised, invasive
 Linaria genistifolia (L.) Mill. subsp. genistifolia, not indigenous, naturalised
 Linaria maroccana Hook.f. not indigenous, naturalised
 Linaria spuria (L.) Mill. accepted as Kickxia spuria (L.) Dumort. subsp. spuria, not indigenous, naturalised
 Linaria vulgaris Mill. not indigenous, naturalised, invasive

Misopates
Genus Misopates:
 Misopates orontium (L.) Raf. subsp. orontium, not indigenous, naturalised, invasive

Plantago
Genus Plantago:
 Plantago afra L. not indigenous, naturalised
 Plantago aristata Michx. not indigenous, naturalised
 Plantago bigelovii A.Gray, not indigenous, naturalised
 Plantago cafra Decne. indigenous
 Plantago coronopus L. not indigenous, naturalised
 Plantago crassifolia Forssk. indigenous
 Plantago crassifolia Forssk. var. crassifolia, indigenous
 Plantago crassifolia Forssk. var. hirsuta (Thunb.) Beg. endemic
 Plantago lanceolata L. indigenous
 Plantago laxiflora Decne. endemic
 Plantago longissima Decne. indigenous
 Plantago major L. not indigenous, naturalised
 Plantago myosuros Lam. not indigenous, naturalised
 Plantago remota Lam. endemic
 Plantago rhodosperma Decne. not indigenous, naturalised
 Plantago virginica L. not indigenous, naturalised

Scoparia
Genus Scoparia:
 Scoparia dulcis L. not indigenous, naturalised

Veronica
Genus Veronica:
 Veronica agrestis L. not indigenous, naturalised
 Veronica anagallis-aquatica L. indigenous
 Veronica arvensis L. not indigenous, naturalised
 Veronica beccabunga L. not indigenous, naturalised
 Veronica chamaedrys L. subsp. chamaedrys, not indigenous, naturalised
 Veronica hederifolia L. not indigenous, naturalised
 Veronica officinalis L. not indigenous, naturalised
 Veronica persica Poir. not indigenous, naturalised
 Veronica serpyllifolia L. not indigenous, naturalised

Scrophulariaceae

Family: Scrophulariaceae,

 Genus Agathelpis:
 Genus Alonsoa:
 Genus Antherothamnus:
 Genus Anticharis:
 Genus Aptosimum:
 Genus Buddleja:
 Genus Capraria:
 Genus Chaenostoma:
 Genus Chamaecrypta:
 Genus Chenopodiopsis:
 Genus Colpias:
 Genus Cromidon:
 Genus Dermatobotrys:
 Genus Diascia:
 Genus Diclis:
 Genus Dischisma:
 Genus Freylinia:
 Genus Glekia:
 Genus Globulariopsis:
 Genus Glumicalyx:
 Genus Gomphostigma:
 Genus Gosela:
 Genus Gratiola:
 Genus Hebenstretia:
 Genus Hemimeris:
 Genus Jamesbrittenia:
 Genus Limosella:
 Genus Lyperia:
 Genus Manulea:
 Genus Melanospermum:
 Genus Microdon:
 Genus Myoporum:
 Genus Nemesia:
 Genus Nemia:
 Genus Oftia:
 Genus Peliostomum:
 Genus Phygelius:
 Genus Phyllopodium:
 Genus Polycarena:
 Genus Pseudoselago:
 Genus Reyemia:
 Genus Selago:
 Genus Sphenandra:
 Genus Strobilopsis:
 Genus Sutera:
 Genus Teedia:
 Genus Tetraselago:
 Genus Trieenea:
 Genus Verbascum:
 Genus Walafrida:
 Genus Zaluzianskya:

Stilbaceae
Family: Stilbaceae,

Anastrabe
Genus Anastrabe:
 Anastrabe integerrima E.Mey. ex Benth. endemic

Bowkeria
Genus Bowkeria:
 Bowkeria citrina Thode, endemic
 Bowkeria cymosa MacOwan, indigenous
 Bowkeria verticillata (Eckl. & Zeyh.) Schinz, indigenous

Campylostachys
Genus Campylostachys:
 Campylostachys cernua (L.f.) Kunth, endemic
 Campylostachys helmei J.C.Manning & Goldblatt, indigenous

Charadrophila
Genus Charadrophila:
 Charadrophila capensis Marloth, endemic

Eurylobium
Genus Eurylobium:
 Eurylobium serrulatum Hochst. accepted as Stilbe serrulata Hochst. present

Euthystachys
Genus Euthystachys:
 Euthystachys abbreviata (E.Mey.) A.DC. endemic

Halleria
Genus Halleria:
 Halleria elliptica Thunb. endemic
 Halleria lucida L. indigenous
 Halleria ovata Benth. endemic

Ixianthes
Genus Ixianthes:
 Ixianthes retzioides Benth. endemic

Kogelbergia
Genus Kogelbergia:
 Kogelbergia phylicoides (A.DC.) Rourke, endemic
 Kogelbergia verticillata (Eckl. & Zeyh.) Rourke, endemic

Nuxia
Genus Nuxia:
 Nuxia congesta R.Br. ex Fresen. indigenous
 Nuxia floribunda Benth. indigenous
 Nuxia glomerulata (C.A.Sm.) I.Verd. endemic
 Nuxia gracilis Engl. endemic
 Nuxia oppositifolia (Hochst.) Benth. indigenous

Retzia
Genus Retzia:
 Retzia capensis Thunb. endemic

Stilbe
Genus Stilbe:
 Stilbe albiflora E.Mey. endemic
 Stilbe chorisepala Suess. accepted as Kogelbergia verticillata (Eckl. & Zeyh.) Rourke, present
 Stilbe ericoides (L.) L. endemic
 Stilbe gymnopharyngia (Rourke) Rourke, endemic
 Stilbe mucronata N.E.Br. accepted as Kogelbergia verticillata (Eckl. & Zeyh.) Rourke, present
 Stilbe overbergensis Rourke, endemic
 Stilbe phylicoides A.DC. accepted as Kogelbergia phylicoides (A.DC.) Rourke, present
 Stilbe rupestris Compton, endemic
 Stilbe serrulata Hochst. endemic
 Stilbe vestita P.J.Bergius, endemic

Thesmophora
Genus Thesmophora:
 Thesmophora scopulosa Rourke, endemic

Xeroplana
Genus Xeroplana:
 Xeroplana gymnopharyngia Rourke, accepted as Stilbe gymnopharyngia (Rourke) Rourke, present
 Xeroplana zeyheri Briq. accepted as Stilbe overbergensis Rourke, present

Verbenaceae
Family: Verbenaceae,

Aloysia
Genus Aloysia:
 Aloysia citrodora Palau, not indigenous, cultivated, naturalised

Bouchea
Genus Bouchea:
 Bouchea glandulifera H.Pearson, accepted as Chascanum garipense E.Mey. present
 Bouchea schlechteri Gurke, accepted as Chascanum schlechteri (Gurke) Moldenke, present
 Bouchea wilmsii Gurke, accepted as Chascanum hederaceum (Sond.) Moldenke var. natalense (H.Pearson) Moldenke, present

Chascanum
Genus Chascanum:
 Chascanum adenostachyum (Schauer) Moldenke, indigenous
 Chascanum caespitosum (H.Pearson) Moldenke, endemic
 Chascanum cernuum (L.) E.Mey. endemic
 Chascanum cuneifolium (L.f.) E.Mey. endemic
 Chascanum garipense E.Mey. indigenous
 Chascanum hederaceum (Sond.) Moldenke, indigenous
 Chascanum hederaceum (Sond.) Moldenke var. hederaceum, indigenous
 Chascanum hederaceum (Sond.) Moldenke var. natalense (H.Pearson) Moldenke, indigenous
 Chascanum incisum (H.Pearson) Moldenke, indigenous
 Chascanum integrifolium (H.Pearson) Moldenke, endemic
 Chascanum krookii (Gurke ex Zahlbr.) Moldenke, endemic
 Chascanum latifolium (Harv.) Moldenke, indigenous
 Chascanum latifolium (Harv.) Moldenke var. glabrescens (H.Pearson) Moldenke, indigenous
 Chascanum latifolium (Harv.) Moldenke var. latifolium, endemic
 Chascanum latifolium (Harv.) Moldenke var. transvaalense Moldenke, indigenous
 Chascanum namaquanum (Bolus ex H.Pearson) Moldenke, indigenous
 Chascanum pinnatifidum (L.f.) E.Mey. indigenous
 Chascanum pinnatifidum (L.f.) E.Mey. var. pinnatifidum, indigenous
 Chascanum pinnatifidum (L.f.) E.Mey. var. racemosum Schinz ex Moldenke, endemic
 Chascanum pumilum E.Mey. indigenous
 Chascanum schlechteri (Gurke) Moldenke, indigenous
 Chascanum schlechteri (Gurke) Moldenke var. schlecteri, indigenous

Duranta
Genus Duranta:
 Duranta erecta L. not indigenous, naturalised, invasive

Lantana
Genus Lantana:
 Lantana camara L. not indigenous, cultivated, naturalised, invasive
 Lantana mearnsii Moldenke, indigenous
 Lantana mearnsii Moldenke var. latibracteolata Moldenke, indigenous
 Lantana rugosa Thunb. indigenous
 Lantana trifolia L. not indigenous, naturalised

Lippia
Genus Lippia:
 Lippia javanica (Burm.f.) Spreng. indigenous
 Lippia pretoriensis H.Pearson, indigenous
 Lippia rehmannii H.Pearson, indigenous
 Lippia scaberrima Sond. indigenous
 Lippia wilmsii H.Pearson, indigenous

Phyla
Genus Phyla:
 Phyla nodiflora (L.) Greene var. nodiflora, not indigenous, naturalised
 Phyla nodiflora (L.) Greene var. rosea (D.Don) Moldenke, not indigenous, naturalised

Plexipus
Genus Plexipus:
 Plexipus adenostachyus (Schauer) R.Fern. accepted as Chascanum adenostachyum (Schauer) Moldenke, present
 Plexipus caespitosus (H.Pearson) R.Fern. accepted as Chascanum caespitosum (H.Pearson) Moldenke, present
 Plexipus cernuus (L.) R.Fern. accepted as Chascanum cernuum (L.) E.Mey. present
 Plexipus cuneifolius (L.f.) Raf. accepted as Chascanum cuneifolium (L.f.) E.Mey. present
 Plexipus garipensis (E.Mey.) R.Fern. accepted as Chascanum garipense E.Mey. present
 Plexipus hederaceus (Sond.) R.Fern. var. hederaceus, accepted as Chascanum hederaceum (Sond.) Moldenke var. hederaceum, present
 Plexipus hederaceus (Sond.) R.Fern. var. natalensis (H.Pearson) R.Fern. accepted as Chascanum hederaceum (Sond.) Moldenke var. natalense (H.Pearson) Moldenke, present
 Plexipus incisus (H.Pearson) R.Fern. accepted as Chascanum incisum (H.Pearson) Moldenke, present
 Plexipus integrifolius (H.Pearson) R.Fern. accepted as Chascanum integrifolium (H.Pearson) Moldenke, present
 Plexipus krookii (Gurke ex Zahlbr.) R.Fern. accepted as Chascanum krookii (Gurke ex Zahlbr.) Moldenke, present
 Plexipus latifolius (Harv.) R.Fern. var. glabrescens (H.Pearson) R.Fern. accepted as Chascanum latifolium (Harv.) Moldenke var. glabrescens (H.Pearson) Moldenke, present
 Plexipus latifolius (Harv.) R.Fern. var. latifolius, accepted as Chascanum latifolium (Harv.) Moldenke var. latifolium, present
 Plexipus latifolius (Harv.) R.Fern. var. transvaalensis (Moldenke) R.Fern. accepted as Chascanum latifolium (Harv.) Moldenke var. transvaalense Moldenke, present
 Plexipus namaquanus (Bolus ex H.Pearson) R.Fern. accepted as Chascanum namaquanum (Bolus ex H.Pearson) Moldenke, present
 Plexipus pinnatifidus (L.f.) R.Fern. var. pinnatifidus, accepted as Chascanum pinnatifidum (L.f.) E.Mey. var. pinnatifidum, present
 Plexipus pinnatifidus (L.f.) R.Fern. var. racemosus (Schinz ex Moldenke) R.Fern. accepted as Chascanum pinnatifidum (L.f.) E.Mey. var. racemosum Schinz ex Moldenke, present
 Plexipus pumilus (E.Mey.) R.Fern. accepted as Chascanum pumilum E.Mey. present
 Plexipus schlechteri (Gurke) R.Fern. var. schlechteri, accepted as Chascanum schlechteri (Gurke) Moldenke, present

Priva
Genus Priva:
 Priva abyssinica Jaub. & Spach, accepted as Priva adhaerens (Forssk.) Chiov. indigenous
 Priva adhaerens (Forssk.) Chiov. indigenous
 Priva africana Moldenke, indigenous
 Priva cordifolia (L.f.) Druce var. abyssinica (Jaub. & Spach) Moldenke, accepted as Priva adhaerens (Forssk.) Chiov. indigenous
 Priva cordifolia (L.f.) Druce var. australis Moldenke, accepted as Priva flabelliformis (Moldenke) R.Fern. indigenous
 Priva cordifolia (L.f.) Druce var. flabelliformis Moldenke, accepted as Priva flabelliformis (Moldenke) R.Fern. indigenous
 Priva flabelliformis (Moldenke) R.Fern. indigenous
 Priva meyeri Jaub. & Spach, indigenous
 Priva meyeri Jaub. & Spach var. meyeri, indigenous

Stachytarpheta
Genus Stachytarpheta:
 Stachytarpheta cayennensis (Rich.) Vahl, not indigenous, naturalised, invasive
 Stachytarpheta mutabilis (Jacq.) Vahl, not indigenous, naturalised, invasive
 Stachytarpheta urticifolia (Salisb.) Sims, not indigenous, naturalised

Verbena
Genus Verbena:
 Verbena aristigera S.Moore, not indigenous, naturalised
 Verbena bonariensis L. not indigenous, naturalised, invasive
 Verbena brasiliensis Vell. not indigenous, naturalised, invasive
 Verbena incompta P.W.Michael, not indigenous, naturalised, invasive
 Verbena litoralis Humb. Bonpl. & Kunth, not indigenous, naturalised
 Verbena officinalis L. not indigenous, naturalised
 Verbena officinalis L. subsp. africana R.Fern. & Verdc. indigenous
 Verbena rigida Spreng. not indigenous, naturalised, invasive
 Verbena tenuisecta Briq. accepted as Verbena aristigera S.Moore, not indigenous, naturalised
 Verbena venosa Gillies & Hook. accepted as Verbena rigida Spreng. not indigenous, naturalised

References

South African plant biodiversity lists
Lamiales